Lieutenant-General Donald Malcolm McNaughton CMM, CD (born August 1934) is a Canadian retired air force general who was Commander, Air Command in Canada from 1985 to 1986.

Career
McNaughton joined the Royal Canadian Air Force in 1952 and trained as a fighter pilot flying F-86 Sabre aircraft. He became Commanding Officer of 427 Squadron in 1973, Deputy Chief of Staff Operations Support at Mobile Command in 1974 and Deputy Commander of 10 Tactical Air Group in 1975 (during which posting he served as Deputy Commander of the Canadian United Nations contingent in the Middle East). He went on to be Base Commander of CFB Winnipeg in 1977, Director General in the Air Branch in the National Defence Headquarters in 1978 and Commander of 10 Tactical Air Group in 1981. After that he became Deputy Commander, Air Command in 1982, Commander, Air Command in 1985 and Deputy Commander of NORAD in 1986 before retiring in 1989.

Notes

References

|-

|-

Commanders of the Order of Military Merit (Canada)
Canadian Forces Air Command generals
Living people
1934 births
Canadian military personnel from Ontario